KOLM (1520 AM, "1520 The Ticket") is a sports formatted radio station in Rochester, Minnesota, and is owned by Townsquare Media. KOLM derives a portion of its programming from CBS Sports Radio.

On August 30, 2013, a deal was announced in which Townsquare would acquire 53 Cumulus Media stations, including KOLM, for $238 million. The deal is part of Cumulus' acquisition of Dial Global; Townsquare and Dial Global are both controlled by Oaktree Capital Management. The sale to Townsquare was completed on November 14, 2013.

References

External links
KOLM official website

Radio stations in Minnesota
Radio stations established in 1959
CBS Sports Radio stations
Townsquare Media radio stations
1959 establishments in Minnesota